Gegeneophis madhavai, the Mudur caecilian, is a species of caecilian found in India. It is only known from its type locality Mudur village, Kundapura Taluk in Udupi district in Karnataka.

References

madhavai
Endemic fauna of India
Fauna of Karnataka
Amphibians of India
Amphibians described in 2004